FC Lokomotiv Dryanovo is a Bulgarian football club from the town of Dryanovo, currently playing in the North-West Third League, the third tier of Bulgarian football. Its home matches take place at the Stadion Lokomotiv with a 3,500-seat capacity. Club colors are red and black. 

The club was officially founded in 1927, after the merging of FC Boyuv Yaz and FC Old Hero. In 1958, the club was a Bulgarian champion of the railwaymen. In 1993/94, Lokomotiv Dryanovo qualified for Round of 16 of the Bulgarian Cup, but were eliminated by FC Chirpan after 0-0 in the first leg and 0-3 in the second leg. Plamen Nikolov, Martin Kushev and Stanislav Genchev is a players whose career began at Lokomotiv. In 2005, Lokomotiv Dryanovo went bankrupt, but one year later the club was restored by Georgi Valev.

The top achievements
 Bulgarian champion of the railwaymen – 1958
 Bulgarian second division:
 Second place - 1 time - 1958
 Third place - 1 time - 1956
 Bulgarian Cup:
 Round of 16 - 1 time - 1993/94

Current squad
As of 1 August 2020

League positions

Notable players
  Martin Kushev
  Stanislav Genchev
  Plamen Nikolov
  Todor Todorov

External links
 FC Lokomotiv Dryanovo Forum at BGSupporters.net

Lokomotiv Dryanovo
1927 establishments in Bulgaria
Dryanovo